

Ephysteris is a genus of the twirler moth family (Gelechiidae). Among these, it is assigned to tribe Gnorimoschemini of the subfamily Gelechiinae. Even though it is a rather diverse and widespread group, most of these small and inconspicuous moths were overlooked by scientists until the early 20th century. Almost 90 species are known today but new ones are still being discovered.

These moths typically have forewing veins 2 and 3 separate but veins 6-8 originating from a common stalk. Somewhat less characteristically, their labial palps have a pointed tip and a furrow on the second segment.

Ochrodia and Opacopsis were initially established as subgenera of Ephysteris but elevated to full genus status later. However, this is not universally accepted and both are included in the present genus here. Microcraspedus is another subgenus of Ephysteris, to which many of the European species are assigned; Echinoglossa is another. But before any of these can be accepted as subgenus or even distinct genus, the internal systematics of Ephysteris sensu lato are in need of review.

Species
The species of Ephysteris are:
Subgenus Ephysteris
 Ephysteris promptella (Staudinger, 1859)
Subgenus Microcraspedus Janse, 1958
 Ephysteris deserticolella (Staudinger, 1871)
 Ephysteris diminutella (Zeller, 1847)
 Ephysteris iberica Povolny, 1977
 Ephysteris insulella (Heinemann, 1870)
 Ephysteris insulella praticolella (Christoph 1872)
 Ephysteris inustella (Zeller, 1847) (type species of Opacopsis)
 Ephysteris inustella gredosensis (Rebel 1935)
 Ephysteris olympica Povolny, 1968
Unknown subgenus
 Ephysteris accentella Povolný, 1968
 Ephysteris aellographa Janse, 1960
 Ephysteris arabiae Povolný, 1968
 Ephysteris aulacopis (Meyrick, 1923)
 Ephysteris brachypogon Meyrick, 1937 (type species of Microcraspedus)
 Ephysteris brachyptera Karsholt & Sattler, 1998
 Ephysteris chretieni Povolný, 1968
 Ephysteris confusa Povolný, 1968
 Ephysteris curtipennis (Zerny, 1935)
 Ephysteris cyrenaica Povolný, 1981
 Ephysteris eremaula (Janse, 1960)
 Ephysteris flavida Povolný, 1969
 Ephysteris fontosus (Povolný, 1999)
 Ephysteris fuscocrossa Janse, 1960
 Ephysteris gobabebensis Bidzilya & Mey, 2011
 Ephysteris gondwana Bidzilya & Mey, 2011
 Ephysteris infirma (Meyrick, 1912)
 Ephysteris juvenilis (Meyrick, 1929)
 Ephysteris kasyi Povolný, 1968
 Ephysteris leptocentra (Meyrick, 1912)
 Ephysteris longicornis J.F.G.Clarke, 1986
 Ephysteris montana H.H.Li & Bidzilya, 2008
 Ephysteris neosirota (Janse, 1950)
 Ephysteris ornata (Janse, 1950)
 Ephysteris parasynecta Janse, 1963
 Ephysteris powelli (Povolný, 1999)
 Ephysteris riadensis Povolný, 1968
 Ephysteris ruth Povolný, 1977
 Ephysteris scimitarella Landry, 2010
 Ephysteris semiophanes (Meyrick, 1918)
 Ephysteris silignitis (Turner, 1919)
 Ephysteris sirota (Meyrick, 1908)
 Ephysteris speciosa Povolný, 1977
 Ephysteris sporobolella Landry, 2010
 Ephysteris suasoria (Meyrick, 1918)
 Ephysteris subcaerulea (Meyrick, 1918)
 Ephysteris subovata Povolný, 2001
 Ephysteris surda (Meyrick, 1923)
 Ephysteris synecta (Meyrick, 1909)
 Ephysteris tenuisaccus K.Nupponen, 2010
 Ephysteris trinota Clarke, 1965 (type species of Echinoglossa)
 Ephysteris unica Povolný, 1971
 Ephysteris wenquana H.H.Li & Bidzilya, 2008

Mostly placed in Ochrodia
 Ephysteris pentamacula Janse, 1958
 Ephysteris subdiminutella (Stainton, 1867) (type species of Ochrodia)

Former species
 Ephysteris albocapitella
 Ephysteris atalopis
 Ephysteris australiae
 Ephysteris bucolica
 Ephysteris buvati (Povolny, 1992)
 Ephysteris cacomicra
 Ephysteris chersaea
 Ephysteris coniogramma
 Ephysteris cretigena
 Ephysteris crocoleuca
 Ephysteris delminiliella
 Ephysteris despectella
 Ephysteris dierli
 Ephysteris dispensata
 Ephysteris ericnista
 Ephysteris extorris
 Ephysteris fanatica
 Ephysteris ferritincta
 Ephysteris fluidescens
 Ephysteris foulonsensis Povolny, 1981
 Ephysteris gallica (Povolny, 1992)
 Ephysteris hispanica Povolny, 1981
 Ephysteris infallax
 Ephysteris insularis
 Ephysteris jamaicensis
 Ephysteris lunaki
 Ephysteris monticola
 Ephysteris obstans (Meyrick, 1928)
 Ephysteris ochrodeta
 Ephysteris oschophora
 Ephysteris oxythectis
 Ephysteris paraleuca
 Ephysteris parvula
 Ephysteris petiginella
 Ephysteris pulverea
 Ephysteris sibila
 Ephysteris tractatum
 Ephysteris treskensis Povolny, 1966
 Ephysteris tribulivora
 Ephysteris turgida
 Ephysteris unitella
 Ephysteris xanthorhabda
 Ephysteris zygophyllella

Footnotes

References

  (2010): Australian Faunal Directory – Ephysteris. Version of 2010-NOV-18. Retrieved 2011-OCT-17.
  (1986): Pyralidae and Microlepidoptera of the Marquesas Archipelago. Smithsonian Contributions to Zoology 416: 1-485. PDF fulltext (214 MB!)
  (2011): Ephysteris. Version 2.4, 2011-JAN-27. Retrieved 2011-OCT-17.
  (2004a): Butterflies and Moths of the World, Generic Names and their Type-species – Ephysteris. Version of 2004-NOV-05. Retrieved 2011-OCT-17.
  (2004b): Butterflies and Moths of the World, Generic Names and their Type-species – Opacopsis. Version of 2004-NOV-05. Retrieved 2011-OCT-17.
  (2001): Markku Savela's Lepidoptera and some other life forms – Ephysteris. Version of 2001-NOV-08. Retrieved 2011-OCT-17.
 , 2010: The gelechiid fauna of the southern Ural Mountains, part I: descriptions of seventeen new species (Lepidoptera: Gelechiidae). Zootaxa 2366: 1-34. Abstract: .
 , 2008: A review of the genus Ehystris Meyrick, 1908 from China, with descriptions of two new species (Lepidoptera: Gelechiidae). Zootaxa 1733: 45-56 Abstract: .
 , 2011: New and little known species of Lepidoptera of southwestern Africa. Esperiana Buchreihe zur Entomologie Memoir 6: 146-261.

 
Gnorimoschemini